Věra Černá (12 April 1938 – 5 November 2008) was a Czech athlete. She competed in the women's shot put at the 1960 Summer Olympics.

References

External links
 

1938 births
2008 deaths
Athletes (track and field) at the 1960 Summer Olympics
Czech female shot putters
Olympic athletes of Czechoslovakia
Athletes from Prague